Crazy Rook or Crazy Castle is a 2015 Iranian film directed by Abolhassan Davoudi and starring Tannaz Tabatabaei, Saed Soheili, Amir Jadidi, Bizhan Emkanian, Saber Abar, Nazanin Bayati and Gohar Kheirandish.

The film won the Best Director and Best Film awards in the 33rd Fajr International Film Festival.

Synopsis
The story follows a group of friends who met through social media and got caught up in a criminal case, the process of solving which brings a new understanding of life and society to each of the group members.

Cast
Tannaz Tabatabaei as Mandana
Saed Soheili as Masoud
Amir Jadidi as Pirouz
Saber Abar as Kaveh
Nazanin Bayati as Ghazal
Hojjat Hassanpour Sargaroui as Saman
Gohar Kheirandish
Bijan Emkanian

Awards 
 Winner Crystal Simorgh for Best Film
 Winner Crystal Simorgh for Best Director
 Winner Crystal Simorgh for Audience Award Best Film

References

External links
 

2015 films
Iranian drama films
2010s Persian-language films
Fiction with unreliable narrators
Films whose director won the Best Directing Crystal Simorgh
Crystal Simorgh for Best Film winners
Crystal Simorgh for Audience Choice of Best Film winners
Iranian thriller films